Bandar Abbas or Bandar-e ‘Abbās, is a port city and capital of Hormozgān Province on the southern coast of Iran, on the Persian Gulf. The city occupies a strategic position on the narrow Strait of Hormuz (just across from Musandam Governorate, Oman), and it is the location of the main base of the Iranian Navy. Bandar Abbas is also the capital and largest city of Bandar Abbas County.  At the 2016 census, its population was 526,648.

Etymology 
Bandar Abbas has always been a port, and as such its various names have all reflected this function. The most common name over time, Gameroon, traditionally derived from Turkish gümrük, "customhouse" (from Late Greek kommerkion, from Latin commercium, "commerce"), but is now speculated to come from Persian kamrūn, "shrimp" (in Portuguese: camarão, similar to the former Portuguese name). Its current name derives from that of Abbas the Great paired with bandar - "port", meaning "Port of Abbas".

Bandar Abbas has been romanized as Bandar ‘Abbās and as Bandar ‘Abbāsī. It has also been referred to as Jaroon by the Arabs and Cameron by the English. Bandar Abbas was formerly known as Cambarão and Porto Comorão by Portuguese traders, as Gombroon by English traders and as Gamrun or Gumrun by Dutch merchants.

History

Pre-Islamic history 
The earliest record of Bandar Abbas is during the reign of Darius the Great (between 522 and 486 BCE). Darius's commander, Silacus, embarked from Bandar Abbas to India and the Red Sea. During Alexander's conquest of the Achaemenid Empire, Bandar Abbas was known under the name of Hormirzad.

Portuguese period
By the 16th century, Bandar Abbas was known as Gamrūn to the Persians. In 1565, a European navigator called it Bamdel Gombruc (that is, Bandar Gümrük, or "Customhouse Port"), citing this as the Persian and Turkish name. Bandar Abbas was conquered by the Portuguese in 1514, and was an important location to protect their commerce in the Persian Gulf and India. They named the city Comorão, due to the presence of lobsters and crabs on its shores.

In 1614, Comorão was taken by Shah Abbas the Great from the Portuguese and renamed Bandar-e Abbas ("Port of Abbas"). Backed by the English Navy, Abbas developed the city (known to the English-speaking world as Gombraun) into a major port. By 1622, the Portuguese and English names had been officially combined to form Combrù or Combu, although the inhabitants still called it Bandar-e Abbas. Sir Thomas Herbert said the official English name was Gumbrown, but pronounced [gŏmrōōn]. He wrote in 1630 that "some (but I commend them not) write it Gamrou, others Gomrow, and othersome Cummeroon." By the 1670s, the city was known as Gameroon.

In 1622 CE, Abbas defeated Portuguese troops with the help of English troops and Iranian commander Imam Quli Khan. In honor of this victory Gumbroon was renamed Bandar Abbas Port. In the current division of Bandar Abbas in Hormozgan province and one of the most important strategic and commercial center is in the vicinity of the Persian Gulf and Oman Sea.

Dutch and English period 
In 1625, a combined Anglo-Dutch fleet attacked the Portuguese at Bandar Abbas and took control of the trade posts. Soon, the Dutch East India Company outcompeted its English counterpart and eventually, from 1654 onwards, was in complete control of the local spice and silk trade until 1765.

Omani period
Between 1794 and 1868, Bandar Abbas was under the control of the Sultanate of Oman and Zanzibar through a lease agreement with Persia. The details of the original lease apparently differed between the Arabic and Persian versions. The Omanis controlled the coastal stretch of some 100 miles from Sadij to Khamir, and inland about 30 miles, as far as Shamil. They also controlled the islands of Hormuz and Qeshm. In 1823, the Persians attempted to oust the Omanis, but the sultan managed to keep his hold on Bandar through bribery and tribute of the governor of Shiraz. In 1845–1846, an army under the governor general of Fars menaced Bandar to extort tribute, while another army under the governor of Kerman besieged Minab. The Omanis threatened to blockade Persia, but the British resident at Bushir convinced them to back down.

The Persians recovered the city in 1854, while the sultan was in Zanzibar. Under British pressure following the Anglo-Persian War in 1856, Persia renewed Oman's lease on favourable terms. It was clarified that the leased territory belonged to the province of Fars and that the Persian flag would fly over Bandar Abbas. The rental rate was also increased. Under British pressure the agreement was renewed in 1868, but at a higher rate of rent and for a shorter duration. Two months after its renewal, the lease was cancelled by the Persian government, citing a clause which permitted its termination if the sultan of Oman were overthrown.

Contemporary history
An earthquake in July 1902 damaged parts of the city, including the governor's house and the customs office, and nearby Qeshm Island.

Mohammad Reza Shah Pahlavi paid particular attention to Bandar Abbas as a strategic port and during his time the government invested huge amounts of capital in the infrastructure.

Bandar Abbas serves as a major shipping point, mostly for imports, and has a long history of trade with India, particularly the port of Surat. Thousands of tourists visit the city and nearby islands including Qeshm and Hormuz every year.

Bandar Abbas was a small fishing port of about 17,000 people in 1955, prior to initial plans to develop it as a major harbor. By 2001, it had grown into a major city. It has a population of 450,000 (2011 estimate).

Geography 

The nearest elevated areas are Mt. Geno,  to the north, and Mt. Pooladi,  to the northwest of the city. South of the city is the island of Qeshm.

Climate 
Bandar Abbas has a hot desert climate (Köppen climate classification BWh).

In the summer, Bandar Abbas sees some of the highest average dew points of any city in the world, averaging  and frequently exceeding . As a result, heat indices generally top  for most days during the summer. This immense humidity causes summer diurnal ranges to be lower than in most desert climates, and is a result of air flow from the warm waters of the Persian Gulf.

Transportation

Air

Bandar Abbas International Airport has capacity and facilities for landing large transport airplanes.

Roads 
Bandar Abbas is accessible via the following highways:
 Bandar Abbas-Sirjan,  to the northeast.
Bandar Abbas-Kerman,  to the northeast.
Bandar Abbas-Shiraz,  to the north.
Bandar Abbas-Zahedan,  to the east.

Rail 
Since 1993, Bandar Abbas has been the southern terminus of Islamic Republic of Iran Railways' main North–South corridor that links it to Yazd, Qom, Tehran and Qazvin to the north.

Language 
Original Bandaris (residents of Bandar Abbas) speak Bandari (بندری), a variety of Persian similar to neighboring Achomi and Dialects of Fars, and distinct from New Persian. Bandari has loanwords from various European languages (e.g. tawāl, "towel") and some from Arabic (e.g. atā [اتى], "to come"), Persian and Balochi.

Products 

 Date, citrus, tobacco and factory goods (e.g. canned tuna).
 Yellow cake uranium (~20 tonnes/year) from the Gchine (Gachin) mine.
 Bandar Abbas is the site of a Chinese-built cruise missile production facility for the manufacture and upgrade of Silkworm (CSS-N-2) cruise missiles.

Exports 
Transit goods, dates, citrus, tobacco, fishery; Bandar Abbas was formerly famous for its export of Iranian pottery, and was known in the west as "goombroon". "Goombroon ware" was the original porcelain imported to England from Goombroon in the early 20th century. It was later replaced by china ware imported from China. Kaolin was the mineral from which the porcelain was made.

Sports 
Aluminium Hormozgan is Bander Abbas's main football (soccer) team. The team was founded in 2006. In 2012 they were promoted to the Iran Pro League but after their first season there they were relegated back to the Azadegan League where they currently play. Bander Abbas also has a second less supported team, Shahrdari Bandar Abbas, which was founded in 2005 and is the municipality's team.

Education

Universities

 Bandar Abbas University of Medical Sciences
 University of Hormozgan
 Islamic Azad University of Bandar Abbas
 Payame Noor University of Bandar Abbas
 Amir Kabir university of technology, Bandar Abbas Branch
 University of Applied Science and Technology, Bandar Abbas Branch

See also 
 2005 Qeshm earthquake
 Bastak
 Bushehr
 History of Iran
 Iran Air Flight 655
 ISOICO
 Kookherd
 Zār

References & notes

Further reading

External links

 
 Bandar Abbas on Iran Chamber Society (www.iranchamber.com)
 Bandar Abbas Port
 www.hums.ac.ir/english/province/hormozgan english/bandar_abbas.htm

 
Populated places in Bandar Abbas County
Cities in Hormozgan Province